Sotiris Tsiodras (Greek: Σωτήρης Τσιόδρας; born 13 October 1965) is a Greek internal medicine physician, specializing in infectiology (infectious diseases), in charge of Greece's management of the coronavirus SARS-CoV-2 crisis.

Early years and education
Tsiodras was born on 13 October 1965 in Sydney, Australia, into an immigrant family originating from Neohori, Argolis. 
After the family moved back to Greece, he enrolled into the Ioannina medical school and then transferred to the University of Athens from which he graduated in March 1991 as a pathologist.

Medical career
In 1993, Tsiodras was assigned to the 401 General Military Hospital of Athens where he served for one year. During the years 1994–1997, he worked as an internal medicine specialist specializing in Internal Medicine at the Einstein Medical Center Philadelphia in the United States. From 1997 to 2001, he enrolled in the programs for infectious diseases at Beth Israel Deaconess Medical Center and Harvard Medical School. Between 1998 and 2001, he worked as a research fellow at Harvard Medical School from which he received a Medical Sciences M.A in June 2001.

In 2003, he defended cum laude his doctoral dissertation at the Medical School of the National and Kapodistrian University of Athens.

COVID-19 pandemic in Greece
In 2020, the government appointed a group of experts to coordinate the country's management of the SARS-CoV-2 pandemic in Greece. Tsiodras was appointed as the team's leader as well as the government's communications liaison for the COVID-19 health crisis.
In December 2021, a study on the management of the fight against the disease in Greece, co-written by Tsiodras and Theodore Lytras, assistant professor of public health at the European University Cyprus, was published in the Scandinavian Journal of Public Health. The study, conducted between September 2020 and May 2021, examined in-hospital mortality of intubated COVID-19 patients, in relation to total intubated patient load, intensive care unit availability, and hospital region. It found that mortality increased by 25% when ICU occupancy exceeded 400 patients, rising progressively to 57% when is went over 800 patients. It also found that "quality of care under increasing patient loads has received less attention" and pointed out "the need for more substantial strengthening of healthcare services, focusing on equity and quality of care besides just expanding capacity." Tsiodras released a statement decrying political exploitation of the publication.

Fake news about Involvement in a H1N1 flu vaccine and drugs scandal
Professor Tsiodras has been the subject of personal attacks published in tabloids. According to erroneous fake news press reports for the period 2009–2010, Sotiris Tsiodras was involved as a rapporteur of the Center for Control of Special Infections in excessive purchases of vaccines and drugs for H1N1 flu under the Minister of Health Dimitris Avramopoulos and the Prime Minister Costas Karamanlis. This of course is not true since the chair of the 2009 pandemic committee was another professor and the procurement of the vaccines was again a political decision by the general secretary of health. It is believed that the high public acceptance of his personality has led several media to attack him with fake news in order to discredit him. It is well known that during the current pandemic several scientists received deaths threats and were the target of fake news.

Media coverage
Le Figaro claimed that Tsiodras was the "new 'main man' of Greeks". In the article, it is claimed that Tsiodras had asked Prime Minister Kyriakos Mitsotakis to impose  strict lockdown measures as soon as the first cases were reported in Italy. Greek sociologist Andreas Drymiotis remarked that "Greeks particularly appreciate [Tsiodras'] calm, his knowledge on the matter, and his deep respect for all victims and the fact that he has an unbreakable dedication to nursing staff."

New York Times journalist Matina Stevis-Gridneff described him as one of the "heroes of the coronavirus era". In May 2020, Frankfurter Allgemeine Zeitung reported that, to Tsiodras, it is "important that nobody is forgotten in a crisis." After many residents of a Roma settlement in Thessaly tested positive for the virus, Tsiodras traveled to the settlement and ordered that the people be supported with food and disinfectants, warning against attempts to "scapegoat" the Roma.

Personal life
Tsiodras is a practicing Orthodox Christian, an aficionado of Byzantine hymnology, and a member of his local church's choir. He and his wife Asimina, née Ghéli, have seven children.

See also
Greek government, post-2019 elections
SARS
World Health Organization

References

External links
Greek Ministry of Health official website (in Greek)

1965 births
Living people
National and Kapodistrian University of Athens alumni
Harvard University alumni
Greek infectious disease physicians
Australian people of Greek descent
Medical doctors from Sydney